Estella may refer to:

People
Diego de Estella (1524–1578)
Estella Sneider (born 1950)
Estella Warren (born 1978), Canadian actress
Estella, the nom de guerre of Italian labor leader Teresa Noce

Fictional
Estella Havisham, a character in Charles Dickens' novel Great Expectations
Estella Von Hellman, the birth name of Cruella De Vil in the movie Cruella (film)
Estella (エステラ), a character in the animated series Vivy: Fluorite Eye's Song produced by Wit Studio

Places
Estella-Lizarra, Navarre, Spain
Estella, New South Wales, Australia
Estella, Wisconsin, United States
Estella Occidental, comarca of Navarre, Spain
Estella Oriental, comarca of Navarre, Spain

Songs
"Estella", by KennyHoopla, 2020

Other
, a United States Navy patrol boat in commission from 1917 to 1919

See also 
 Estela (disambiguation)